Nicolle Van Den Broeck (9 November 1946 – 17 April 2017) was a Belgian racing cyclist. She won the Belgian national road race title in 1969, 1970, 1973, 1974 and 1977, and became world champion in 1973.

References

External links

1946 births
2017 deaths
Belgian female cyclists
UCI Road World Champions (women)
Cyclists from Flemish Brabant
People from Meise